Liepa Parish is an administrative territorial entity of Cēsis Municipality in the Vidzeme region of Latvia. Prior to 2009, it was an administrative unit of the former Cēsis District.

History 
Liepa Parish was established on the territory of the former Liepa Manor (Lindenhof). In 1935, Cēsis County had an area of 68.9 km² and a population of 1262 inhabitants.  

During the Soviet occupation, in 1945 Dunduri village and Liepas village councils were established, but were dissolved in 1949. That same year, the Cēsis District was established from a part of the former county. In 1954, the Dunduri village was added to Liepa village. In 1990 the village was reorganized into a parish. 

From 2009 until 2021, Liepa Parish was part of the former Priekuļi Municipality. Since 1 July 2021, the Parish is a part of Cēsis Municipality.

Towns, villages and settlements of Liepa parish 
Dukuļi
Liepa
Liepasmuiža
Obuļi
Sarkaņi
Saulītes
Skangaļi
Stuķi

See also 
Liepa Manor

References 

Parishes of Latvia
Cēsis Municipality
Vidzeme